Episcythris is a genus of moths in the family Scythrididae.

Species
 Episcythris arenicolorella Bengtsson, 1997
 Episcythris albiflua (Meyrick, 1928)
 Episcythris algirica Passerin d'Entrèves, 1991
 Episcythris amseli Passerin d'Entrèves, 1991
 Episcythris asymetrica Passerin d'Entrèves, 1991
 Episcythris bouhedmae Passerin d'Entrèves, 1991
 Episcythris cremorella (Zerny, 1935)
 Episcythris grossi Bengtsson, 1997
 Episcythris pseudoalbiflua Passerin d'Entrèves, 1991
 Episcythris triangulella (Ragonot, 1875)
 Episcythris walsinghami Passerin d'Entrèves, 1991
 Episcythris zuninoi Passerin d'Entrèves, 1990

References

Scythrididae
Moth genera